Potato bug may refer to:

Species
 Armadillidium vulgare, a species of woodlouse
 Colorado potato beetle
 Jerusalem cricket, an insect

Other uses
 Potato Bug, a character in The Mr. Potato Head Show
 A style of mandolin with a body constructed of contrasting woods, resembling the striped markings of the potato beetle

Animal common name disambiguation pages